Robert Nichols (15 July 1919-October 14, 2010) was an American poet, playwright, novelist, and architect.

Born Robert Brayton Nichols in Worcester, Massachusetts 15 July 1919, Nichols served as an officer in the United States Navy in World War II, and attended and earned two degrees from Harvard University, the first a bachelors and the second in landscape architecture. His work in landscape architecture includes a redesign of Washington Square Park. Nichols' poetry includes the volumes Red Shift (1977), and Slow Newsreel of Man Riding Train (1962, number 15 in the City Lights Pocket Poets Series).  He also wrote the short story collection, In the Air (1991), and novels, including From the Steam Room (1993), and a four-part series of novellas set in the utopia Nghsi-Altai. Nichols was a co-founder of the Judson Poets Theatre, and participated in the Theater for the New City and the Bread and Puppet Theater.

Nichols' first marriage was to the Village Voice editor, Mary Perot Nichols, which ended in divorce in 1969.  Nichols married author Grace Paley in 1972, and they remained married until her death in 2007.

Further reading

References

External links 
 

1919 births
2010 deaths
American male poets
American male novelists
20th-century American dramatists and playwrights
American landscape architects
Writers from Worcester, Massachusetts
Harvard University alumni
20th-century American male writers